Propylamine, also known as n-propylamine, is an amine with the chemical formula CH3(CH2)2NH2.  It is a colorless volatile liquid.

Propylamine is a weak base.  Its Kb (base dissociation constant) is 4.7 × 10−4.

Preparation
Propyl amine hydrochloride can be prepared by reacting 1-propanol with ammonium chloride at high temperature and pressure using a Lewis acid catalyst such as ferric chloride.

References

External links 
 International Chemical Safety Card

Alkylamines
Propyl compounds